Christine Margaret Rubie-Davies  is a New Zealand education academic, and as of 2014 is a full professor and head of school at the University of Auckland.

Academic career
After more than two decades working in primary education and a 2003 PhD titled  'Expecting the best : instructional practices, teacher beliefs and student outcomes'  at the University of Auckland, Rubie-Davies joined the staff, rising to full professor.

In the 2023 New Year Honours, Davies was appointed a Member of the New Zealand Order of Merit, for services to education.

Selected works 
 Rubie‐Davies, Christine, John Hattie, and Richard Hamilton. "Expecting the best for students: Teacher expectations and academic outcomes." British Journal of Educational Psychology 76, no. 3 (2006): 429–444.
 Rubie‐Davies, Christine M. "Classroom interactions: Exploring the practices of high‐and low‐expectation teachers." British Journal of Educational Psychology 77, no. 2 (2007): 289–306.
 Rubie‐Davies, Christine M. "Teacher expectations and student self‐perceptions: Exploring relationships." Psychology in the Schools 43, no. 5 (2006): 537–552.
 Rubie‐Davies, Christine M. "Teacher expectations and perceptions of student attributes: Is there a relationship?." British Journal of Educational Psychology 80, no. 1 (2010): 121–135.
 Rubie‐Davies, Christine M., Annaline Flint, and Lyn G. McDonald. "Teacher beliefs, teacher characteristics, and school contextual factors: What are the relationships?." British Journal of Educational Psychology 82, no. 2 (2012): 270–288.

References

External links
  
 
 

Living people
New Zealand women academics
University of Auckland alumni
Academic staff of the University of Auckland
New Zealand educational theorists
Year of birth missing (living people)
Members of the New Zealand Order of Merit